Nandanam is a neighborhood of Chennai, India.

Nandanam may also refer to:

Nandanam, Bhongir mandal, a village in Telangana, India
Nandanam (film), an Indian film